Socol is a commune in Caraș-Severin County, Romania (in the Clisura Dunării area of Banat). In 2011, the population of the commune numbered 1,873 people and its population was ethnically mixed. It is composed of five villages: Baziaș, Câmpia, Pârneaura, Socol and Zlatița.

Sokol means "falcon" in Serbian. The commune is officially bilingual, with both Romanian and Serbian being used as working languages on public signage and in administration, education and justice.

Demographics and name
In 2011, population included:
 52.9% Serbs
 36.8% Romanians
 5.6% Roma
 3.7% Czechs
 0.6% Hungarians

Baziaș
Baziaș is a village of Socol commune, notable as the place where the Danube enters Romania, and where, in 1854, the first railway line was opened on the territory of present-day Romania—the line ran from Baziaș to Oravița, at a time when the area was under Austrian administration. The village has a significant Serbian heritage, being the site of Baziaș Monastery, said to have been founded in 1225 by Saint Sava while on a brief refuge there, and rebuilt several times. The local forest includes several protected plant species.

Natives
Miodrag Belodedici (born 1964), a former world-class soccer player
Petru Dumitriu (1924–2002), novelist

See also
 Serbs in Romania

References

Communes in Caraș-Severin County
Localities in Romanian Banat
Serb communities in Romania
Czech communities in Romania
Place names of Slavic origin in Romania